Victoria Gran Hayward (born 11 April 1992) is Canadian, former collegiate All-American, medal-winning Olympian, professional softball player. She played college softball for Washington from 2011–14. She most recently played for the Canadian Wild in the National Pro Fastpitch. She played in the inaugural season of the Athletes Unlimited Softball league and finished in third place overall in points earned. She is an outfielder and bats and throws left-handed. She has played for the Canadian Senior Women's softball team since June 2009 and helped them win a bronze medal at the 2020 Summer Olympics.

Early life
Born in Toronto, Victoria grew up in Mountain View, California and went to Mountain View High School (MVHS). She holds a Bachelor of Arts in Communications and Political Science from the University of Washington and a master's degree in Business Administration from the University of Massachusetts.

Playing career

College
She attended the University of Washington for four years from 2011 to 2014 and played outfield for the Washington Huskies softball program.  She was a 2014 All-American and a four-time All-Pac-12 selection. With the University of Washington, she won four NCAA Regional Championships and advanced to the 2013 Women's College World Series.

Professional
Hayward was drafted 19th overall by the Pennsylvania Rebellion in the 2014 NPF Draft. She played professionally for the Rebellion in 2015 and 2016.  She joined the Canadian Wild in 2019 and in 2020 became the first player to sign with the Athletes Unlimited Softball league.

National Team
Hayward has played with the Canadian Women's Senior National team since 2009 and at 16, was the youngest player to appear for the Canadian national team.  She has won five medals competing for Canada - two Silver at the Pan American Games and three Bronze medals at the World Championships.  She was named to the 2015 Pan American Games team that won Gold, but was unable to compete due to injury. She represented Canada at the 2020 Summer Olympics, where she recorded six hits to hit .300, including two during the bronze medal game to defeat Team Mexico 3–2.

Coaching career
After finishing her college softball career, she became a coach. She joined Louisiana State University in 2015, where she helped guide the team to a third-place finish at the Women's College World Series. In 2016 and 2017, she was an assistant coach for the University of Massachusetts helping them to back-to-back winning seasons in 2016 and 2017. In 2018, she was an assistant coach at the University of Maryland and was Director of Operations for the University of Central Florida softball team in 2019.

Statistics

References

 
 
 
 

1992 births
Living people
Canadian softball players
Competitors at the 2022 World Games
Softball players at the 2011 Pan American Games
Washington Huskies softball players
Sportspeople from Toronto
Pan American Games gold medalists for Canada
Pan American Games silver medalists for Canada
Pan American Games medalists in softball
Medalists at the 2011 Pan American Games
Pennsylvania Rebellion players
Softball players at the 2020 Summer Olympics
Olympic softball players of Canada
Medalists at the 2020 Summer Olympics
Olympic bronze medalists for Canada
Olympic medalists in softball